The Gutnius Lutheran Church, formerly the Wabag Lutheran Church, is a Lutheran body existing in Papua New Guinea. Gutnius means "Good News" in Tok Pisin. It was established by the Lutheran Church–Missouri Synod in 1948, shortly after the Australian administration of the Territory of Papua and New Guinea permitted missionary activity to spread into the western highlands. The church counts 125.000 parishioners, largely confined to Enga Province in the western highlands. It operates Immanuel Lutheran Hospital and St. Paul's Lutheran Secondary School (Pausa) at Wapenamanda, Enga Province. The church has other health and educational institutions as well.

It has suffered some attrition in numbers as fundamentalist and charismatic sects based in the United States of America have conducted aggressive proselytising activities among its members in the Enga.

In recent decades the church has increasingly established ties with the longer-established, theologically more liberal, and liturgically more conservative Evangelical Lutheran Church of Papua New Guinea. It co-operates with the Evangelical Lutheran Church in conducting clergy education and, with that Lutheran denomination and the Anglican Church of Papua New Guinea, in operating the Balob Teachers College in Lae.

References

Further reading
Spruth, Erwin Luther. And the Word of God Spread: A Brief History of the Gutnius Lutheran Church, Papua New Guinea. Ann Arbor, 1981.

External links
International Lutheran Council information on the Gutnius Lutheran Church

International Lutheran Council members
Lutheranism in Papua New Guinea
Churches in Papua New Guinea
Christian organizations established in 1948
1948 establishments in the Territory of Papua
1948 establishments in Papua New Guinea
Lutheran World Federation members